Ottoman Sign Language, also known as Seraglio Sign Language or Harem Sign Language, was a deaf sign language of the Ottoman court in Istanbul. Nothing is known of it directly, but it is reported that it could communicate ideas of any complexity, and that it was passed on to the young through fables, histories, and scripture.

During the reign of Suleiman the Magnificent, two deaf brothers were brought to the court. During this time, keeping disabled people at royal courts as oddities or pets was a fairly common practice (see court dwarf). These brothers were originally brought to court as such. They knew a sign language, likely a home sign of their own invention. Out of this, the practice was born.

In 16th and 17th centuries, deaf pages, doormen, executioners, and companions of the sultan were valued for their ability to communicate silently, for their inability to overhear sensitive information at secret negotiations, and for the difficulty outsiders had in communicating with them or bribing them. At court, silence was at a premium, and several sultans preferred that sign language be used in their presence; they were able to jest with them in a way that would be inappropriately familiar in Turkish. Osman II (r. 1618–1622) was perhaps the first sultan to learn to sign, and ordered many of the hearing of his court to follow his lead. At their height, there may have been over a hundred deaf courtiers at any one time; it was considered undignified for the sultan to address his subjects orally, and also unseemly for those before him either to speak aloud, disturbing him, or to whisper secretly. 

It is not known whether Ottoman Sign Language was ancestral to modern Turkish Sign Language, as no signs were recorded.

References

External links
M. Miles, 2000, Signing in the Seraglio: mutes, dwarfs and jestures at the Ottoman Court 1500–1700 Reprinted from "Disability and Society"
M. Miles, 2000, Deaf People, Sign Language & Communication, in Ottoman & Modern Turkey: Observations and Excerpts from 1300 to 2009
Kristina Richardson, "New Evidence for Early Modern Ottoman Arabic and Turkish Sign Systems", Sign Language Studies (Winter 2017) 17.2: 172–192. doi=10.1353/sls.2017.0001

Bibliography
Nicholas Mirzoeff, 1995, "Framed: the deaf in the harem". In Terry, Jennifer, and Jacqueline Urla, Deviant bodies: critical perspectives on difference in science and popular culture. Indiana University Press, p.49–77. 

Sign language isolates
Sign languages of Turkey